The Symphony No. 7 of Roger Sessions was written in 1967 for the 150th anniversary of the University of Michigan . It was premiered in Ann Arbor, Michigan, on October 1, 1967, by the Chicago Symphony Orchestra, conducted by Jean Martinon.

Instrumentation
The symphony is scored for three flutes, three oboes, four clarinets, three bassoons, four horns, three trumpets, three trombones, one tuba, timpani, percussion, piano, harp, and strings.

Structure and character
It is in three movements: 
Allegro con fuoco
Lento e dolce
Allegro misurato – Tempo I, ma impetuoso – Epilogue: Largo

Andrea Olmstead describes all of Sessions's symphonies as "serious" and "funereal", with No. 7 being one of four with, "quiet reflective endings."

The composer said that the symphony was influenced by the Story of O.

Recordings
Peter Leonard/Louisville Orchestra (Louisville First Edition Records LS 776, 1981. With Sessions' Divertimento for Orchestra.)
Dennis Russell Davies/American Composers Orchestra (Argo 444 519–2, 1995. Symphonies 6, 7, 9.)

References

Sources

Further reading
 Imbrie, Andrew. "The Symphonies of Roger Sessions". Tempo (new series), no. 103 (December 1972): 24–32.

Symphonies by Roger Sessions
1967 compositions